Niphoparmena flavescens is a species of beetle in the family Cerambycidae. It was described by Stephan von Breuning in 1950, originally under the genus Mimamblymora.

References

flavescens
Beetles described in 1950